James A. Koerner is an American college baseball coach and former outfielder. Koerner was the head baseball coach of the North Carolina Central Eagles (2012–2021).

Playing career
Koerner played baseball for St. John Fisher College from 1994 to 1997 as an outfielder.

Following graduation, Koerner signed with the Richmond Roosters of the Frontier League.

Coaching career
Koerner began his coaching career as the head coach for the Medaille College Mavericks baseball team, where he helped found the program. He compiled a 23–62 record in three seasons. While at Medaille, Koerner helped develop the schools first ever North Eastern Athletic Conference Co-Player of the Year. Koerner then left the Mavericks to become an assistant for the Monmouth Hawks baseball program. After just a single season at Monmouth, he accepted a position as an assistant and the recruiting coordinator for the Marshall Thundering Herd baseball team. Koerner then accepted the same position for the Buffalo Bulls baseball program.

On June 16, 2011, Koerner was named the head coach of the North Carolina Central Eagles baseball team.

On April 13, 2021,  Koerner was hired by USA Baseball as Director of Player Development.

Head coaching record

→←

References

External links
North Carolina Central Eagles bio

Living people
1975 births
Baseball outfielders
St. John Fisher Cardinals
Richmond Roosters players
Monmouth Hawks baseball coaches
Marshall Thundering Herd baseball coaches
Buffalo Bulls baseball coaches
North Carolina Central Eagles baseball coaches